The U.S. state of Nebraska first required its residents to register their motor vehicles in 1905. Registrants provided their own license plates for display until 1915, when the state began to issue plates.

, plates are issued by the Nebraska Department of Motor Vehicles (DMV). Front and rear plates are required for most classes of vehicles, while only rear plates are required for motorcycles and trailers. All state-issued plates were made of steel until 1947 when aluminum plates were introduced.

Passenger baseplates

1915 to 1965
The 1955 (dated 1956) issue was the first Nebraska license plate that complied with these standards.

1966 to present

Optional plates

Non-passenger plates

County coding

Nebraska established a county-code system for its passenger and motorcycle plates in 1922, with one- or two-digit codes assigned to each county in order of the number of registered vehicles in the county at that time. These codes remained constant through 1950.

For 1951, letter codes were used. One-letter codes were assigned to the first counties whose names began with those letters, while all other counties were assigned two-letter codes consisting of the initial letter and the next available letter in their names (the letters I, O and Q were not used). There were three exceptions: Douglas County, the most populous in the state, was assigned single-letter X to increase capacity; Otoe County was assigned Z as O was not allowed; and Dodge County was assigned DG instead of DD as double-letter codes were also not allowed.

The numeric code system was reintroduced in 1952, with the codes the same as before. It remains in use, except in Douglas, Lancaster, and Sarpy Counties, which adopted an uncoded ABC 123 serial format in 2002.

References

External links
Nebraska license plates, 1969–present

Nebraska
Nebraska transportation-related lists
Transportation in Nebraska